Husia may refer to:
 Husia, a village administered by the town of Jibou, Romania
 Husia, an island in the Rotuma Group of Fiji